The Noire River (in French: rivière Noire) is a watercourse running through the municipalities of Saint-Zénon, Sainte-Émélie-de-l'Énergie and Saint-Jean-de-Matha, in the Matawinie Regional County Municipality (MRC), in the administrative region of Lanaudière, in Quebec, in Canada.

Toponymy 
The toponym Rivière Noire was made official on 5 December 1968 at the Place Names Bank of the Commission de toponymie du Québec.

See also 
 Sept-Chutes Regional Park
 List of rivers of Quebec

References

External links 
 Official site of Saint-Zénon
 Official site of Sainte-Émilie-de-l'Énergie
 Official site Saint-Jean-de-Matha

Rivers of Lanaudière